Verdina Shlonsky (Hebrew: וורדינה (רוזה) שלונסקי) (January 22, 1905 – February 20, 1990) was an Israeli composer, pianist, publicist and painter.

Biography
Verdina (Rosa) Shlonsky was born to a Hasidic Jewish family in Kremenchuk in the Russian Empire, the youngest of six children. (The Hebrew root of the name Verdina is  וורד "vered" or "rose".)

The family immigrated to Palestine in 1923, but she remained in Vienna to continue her music education. From there, she moved to Berlin, where she studied with pianists Egon Petri and Artur Schnabel. In Paris, she studied  composition with Nadia Boulanger, Edgard Varèse and Max Deutsch. In 1925, she and her sister a successful opera singer Judith Shlonsky (Nina Valery), who had returned to Europe, married two brothers: Sigmund and Alexander Sternik. Both couples soon divorced.

Upon settling in Palestine, she joined the faculty of the Tel Aviv Academy of Music. Among her noted compositions were "Hebrew Poem" (1931) and "Quartet for Strings", which won an award at the 1948 Béla Bartók Competition in Budapest.

She was the younger sister of poet Avraham Shlonsky, and older sister of the mezzo-soprano Nina Valery.

Selected recordings
 "Pages from the diary" on Verbotene Klänge: Sechs Suiten by Fidan Aghayeva-Edler CD. KR10133. 2019

See also
Music of Israel
Journalism in Israel

References

External links 
 biography, with photo, Israel Music Institute
 Another profile with different photo
 Femmes Compositrices profile (French)
 

1905 births
1990 deaths
People from Kremenchuk
Ukrainian Jews
Israeli composers
Israeli classical pianists
Israeli women pianists
Jewish classical pianists
20th-century classical composers
20th-century classical pianists
Women classical composers
Jewish composers
Jewish classical composers
Women classical pianists
20th-century women composers
20th-century women pianists